Peder Meen Johansen (born 27 August 2003) is a Norwegian football midfielder who plays for Grorud.

Starting his career in local Sandefjord club Store Bergan IL, he joined Sandefjord Fotball's junior setup in 2018. He was promoted to the senior squad in 2020 and made his Eliteserien debut in June 2020 against Haugesund.

References

2003 births
Living people
People from Sandefjord
Norwegian footballers
Sandefjord Fotball players
Eliteserien players
Association football midfielders
Sportspeople from Vestfold og Telemark